Max Steel is a Mattel toy line.

Max Steel may also refer to:

Max Steel (2000 TV series), an animated TV series
Max Steel (2013 TV series), an animated TV series
Max Steel (film), a 2016 live-action superhero film 
Max Steel: Covert Missions, a video game
Max Steel: Endangered Species, a 2004 direct-to-DVD film 
Max Steel: Forces of Nature, a 2005 direct-to-DVD film
Max Steel: Dark Rival, a 2007 direct-to-DVD film 
Stelvio Massi (1929–2004), an Italian director sometimes credited "Max Steel"

See also
 Maxx Steele, a character from the unrelated Robo Force toy line

Max Steel